This is list of members of the Argentine Senate from 10 December 2009 to 9 December 2011.

Composition
as of 9 December 2011

Senate leadership

Election cycles

List of senators

Notes

References

External links
List on the official website (archived) 

2009-2011
2009 in Argentina
2010 in Argentina
2011 in Argentina